Margot van Geffen (born 23 November 1989) is a Dutch field hockey player.

She took up field hockey aged six and since 2011 is a member of the Dutch national team. She won the 2014 World Cup and a gold and a silver medal at the 2012 and 2016 Olympics, respectively. After the 2012 Olympics she was invested as a Knight of the Order of Orange-Nassau.

References

External links

 

1989 births
Living people
Dutch female field hockey players
Field hockey players at the 2012 Summer Olympics
Medalists at the 2012 Summer Olympics
Olympic field hockey players of the Netherlands
Olympic gold medalists for the Netherlands
Olympic medalists in field hockey
Sportspeople from Tilburg
Field hockey players at the 2016 Summer Olympics
Field hockey players at the 2020 Summer Olympics
Medalists at the 2016 Summer Olympics
Olympic silver medalists for the Netherlands
Female field hockey defenders
HC Den Bosch players
Medalists at the 2020 Summer Olympics
20th-century Dutch women
21st-century Dutch women